Ulrich Karnatz (born 2 December 1952) is a German rower who competed for East Germany in the 1976 Summer Olympics.

He was born in Rostock. In 1976, he was a crew member of the East German boat, which won the gold medal in the eight event. Four years later, he won his second gold medal with the East German boat in the eight competition.

References

1952 births
Living people
Rowers from Rostock
People from Bezirk Rostock
East German male rowers
Sportspeople from Mecklenburg-Western Pomerania
Olympic rowers of East Germany
Rowers at the 1976 Summer Olympics
Rowers at the 1980 Summer Olympics
Olympic gold medalists for East Germany
Olympic medalists in rowing
Medalists at the 1980 Summer Olympics
Medalists at the 1976 Summer Olympics
World Rowing Championships medalists for East Germany
Recipients of the Patriotic Order of Merit in gold